Connecticut's 80th House of Representatives district elects one member of the Connecticut House of Representatives. It consists of the town of Wolcott and parts of Southington. It has been represented by Republican Gale Mastrofrancesco since 2019.

Recent elections

2020

2018

2016

2014

2012

References

80